|}

This is a list of House of Assembly results for the 1985 South Australian state election.

Results by electoral district

Adelaide 

 Adelaide became a notionally Liberal held seat in the redistribution. Michael Wilson was the sitting member for the abolished district of Torrens.

Albert Park

Alexandra

Baudin

Bragg

Briggs

Bright

Chaffey

Coles

Custance

Davenport

Elizabeth

Eyre

Fisher

Flinders

Florey

Gilles

Goyder

Hanson

Hartley

Hayward

Henley Beach

Heysen

Kavel

Light

Mawson

Mitcham

Mitchell

Morphett

Mount Gambier

Murray-Mallee

Napier

Newland 

 Newland became a notional Liberal held seat in the redistribution. Scott Ashenden was the sitting member for the district of Todd.

Norwood

Peake

Playford

Price

Ramsay

Ross Smith

Semaphore

Spence

Stuart

Todd 

 Todd became a notionally Labor held seat in the redistribution.

Unley

Victoria

Walsh

Whyalla

See also
 Candidates of the 1985 South Australian state election
 Members of the South Australian House of Assembly, 1985–1989

References

1985
1985 elections in Australia
1980s in South Australia